Rineloricaria thrissoceps is a species of catfish in the family Loricariidae. It is native to South America, where it occurs in the Santa Lucia River basin in Uruguay. The species reaches 10.6 cm (4.2 inches) in length and is believed to be a facultative air-breather.

References 

Loricariidae
Fish described in 1943
Catfish of South America
Fish of Uruguay
Taxa named by Henry Weed Fowler